is a 2017 Japanese anime film produced by Shin-Ei Animation. It is the 25th film of the popular comedy manga and anime series Crayon Shin-chan. It was released on 15 April 2017 in Japanese theatres. It is directed by Masakazu Hashimoto, who also directed the 21st movie Crayon Shin-chan: Very Tasty! B-class Gourmet Survival!! and 23rd movie Crayon Shin-chan: My Moving Story! Cactus Large Attack!.

This is the fourth time that a Crayon Shin-chan movie is based on aliens, the previous ones being Action Kamen vs Leotard Devil in 1993, The Storm Called: The Singing Buttocks Bomb in 2007 and The Storm Called!: Me and the Space Princess in 2012. The 2016 spin-off season Gaiden Alien vs. Shinnosuke was also based on aliens. With this movie, Crayon Shin-chan celebrates the silver jubilee of its movie series.

Neofilms later opened the film in Hong Kong in summer 2017.

Slogan

Synopsis
One day, the Nohara family met a mysterious alien from outer space named Shiriri. On being basked by a ray emitted by Shiriri, Hiroshi and Misae became 25 years younger and appeared as kids. To be able to return into adult form, they must find Shiriri's father, who is somewhere in Japan. This situation, which initially started with Shinnosuke's family and later his friends, gradually involves the entire of Japan.

Cast
 Akiko Yajima as Shinnosuke Nohara
 Miki Narahashi as Misae Nohara
 Toshiyuki Morikawa as Hiroshi Nohara 
 Satomi Korogi as Himawari Nohara
 Mari Mashiba as Toru Kazama and Shiro
 Tamao Hayashi as Nene Sakurada
 Teiyū Ichiryūsai as Masao Satou
 Chie Sato as Bo-chan

Guest Cast
 Miyuki Sawashiro as Shiriri
 Hiroyuki Miyasako (from Ameagari Kesshitai) as Shiriri's father
 Tōru Hotohara as Morudada
 Mirai Shida as herself

Theme Song

Opening Theme Song
Kimi ni 100 Percent (Warner Music Japan / unBORDE)
 Singer : Kyary Pamyu Pamyu

Ending Theme Song

 Singer: Yuu Takahashi

Reception

The movie grossed an all total of ￥1.62 billion in Japan  and $13,101,686 worldwide.

DVD and BD Release
The DVD and Blu-ray of this movie was released by Bandai Visual in Japan on November 10, 2017.

See also
 Yoshito Usui

Notes

References
tuhgh

External links
 

2017 anime films
2017 films
Invasion!! Alien Shiriri
Toho animated films